In mathematics, Pythagorean addition is a binary operation on the real numbers that computes the length of the hypotenuse of a right triangle, given its two sides.

where  denotes the Pythagorean addition operation.

This operation can be used in the conversion of Cartesian coordinates to polar coordinates. It also provides a simple notation and terminology for some formulas when its summands are complicated; for example, the energy-momentum relation in physics becomes

It is implemented in many programming libraries as the hypot function, in a way designed to avoid errors arising due to limited-precision calculations performed on computers. In its applications to signal processing and propagation of measurement uncertainty, the same operation is also called addition in quadrature.

Applications

Pythagorean addition (and its implementation as the hypot function) is often used together with the atan2 function to convert from Cartesian coordinates  to polar coordinates :

If measurements  have independent errors  respectively, the quadrature method gives the overall error,

whereas the upper limit of the overall error is

if the errors were not independent.

This is equivalent of finding the magnitude of the resultant of adding orthogonal vectors, each with magnitude equal to the uncertainty, using the Pythagorean theorem.

In signal processing, addition in quadrature is used to find the overall noise from independent sources of noise. For example, if an image sensor gives six digital numbers of shot noise, three of dark current noise and two of Johnson–Nyquist noise under a specific condition, the overall noise is

digital numbers, showing the dominance of larger sources of noise.

Properties
The operation  is associative and commutative, and 

This means that the real numbers under  form a commutative semigroup.

The real numbers under  are not a group, because  can never produce a negative number as its result, whereas each element of a group must be the result of multiplication of itself by the identity element. On the non-negative numbers, it is still not a group, because Pythagorean addition of one number by a second positive number can only increase the first number, so no positive number can have an inverse element. Instead, it forms a commutative monoid on the non-negative numbers, with zero as its identity.

Implementation
Hypot is a mathematical function defined to calculate the length of the hypotenuse of a right-angle triangle. It was designed to avoid errors arising due to limited-precision calculations performed on computers. Calculating the length of the hypotenuse of a triangle is possible using the square root function on the sum of two squares, but hypot avoids problems that occur when squaring very large or very small numbers. If calculated using the natural formula,

The hypot function was designed to calculate the result without causing this problem.

If either input to hypot is infinite, the result is infinite. Because this is true for all possible values of the other input, the IEEE 754 floating-point standard requires that this remains true even when the other input is not a number (NaN).

Since C++17, there has been an additional hypot function for 3D calculations:

Calculation order
The difficulty with the naive implementation is that  may overflow or underflow, unless the intermediate result is computed with extended precision. A common implementation technique is to exchange the values, if necessary, so that , and then to use the equivalent form

The square root is computed of a value between 1 and 2. Finally, the multiplication by  cannot underflow, and overflows only when the result is too large to represent. This implementation has the downside that it requires an additional floating-point division, which can double the cost of the naive implementation, as multiplication and addition are typically far faster than division and square root. Typically, the implementation is slower by a factor of 2.5 to 3.

More complex implementations avoid this by dividing the inputs into more cases:
 When  underflows, scale as above but reverse the scaling factors to scale up the intermediate values.
 Otherwise, the naive algorithm is safe to use.
However, this implementation is extremely slow when it causes incorrect jump predictions due to different cases. Additional techniques allow the result to be computed more accurately, e.g. to less than one ulp.

Programming language support
The function is present in many programming languages and libraries, including
CSS,
C++11,
D,
Go,
JavaScript (since ES2015),
Julia,
Java (since version 1.5),
Kotlin,
MATLAB,
PHP,
Python,
Ruby,
Rust,
and Scala.

See also
Euclidean distance
Alpha max plus beta min algorithm
Metafont has Pythagorean addition and subtraction as built-in operations, under the names ++ and +-+ respectively.

References

Further reading
.

Operations on numbers
Addition
Numerical analysis